Haílton Corrêa de Arruda (born April 26, 1937), best known as Manga,  is a Brazilian retired football goalkeeper, famous for playing alongside Garrincha, Nílton Santos and Zagallo in Botafogo of the 1960s, and also for winning the Copa Libertadores and the Intercontinental Cup in 1971 with Nacional of Cubilla and Artime. He was the starting keeper in the Brazil national team in the 1966 FIFA World Cup.

Manga started his career in 1955 in Sport Recife. In 1959 he moved to Botafogo, where he became a national celebrity. In 1966 he was the Brazilian goalkeeper in the 1966 FIFA World Cup. In the 1970s he also played for Sport Club Internacional (where he won two national titles), Coritiba and Grêmio. He also played in Uruguay and Ecuador, where he finished his career at the age of 44.

Honours

Sport Recife
Campeonato Pernambucano: 1955, 1956 and 1957

Botafogo
Paris Intercontinental Tournament: 1963
Caracas Triangular Tournament: 1967, 1968
Taça Brasil: 1968
Rio-São Paulo Tournament: 1962, 1964 and 1966
Campeonato Carioca: 1961, 1962, 1967 and 1968
Tournament Home: 1961, 1962 and 1963
Guanabara Cup: 1967, 1968
Colombia International Tournament: 1960
Mexico Pentagonal: 1962
La Paz Football Association Golden Jubilee Tournament: 1964
Paramaribo Cup: 1964
Ibero-American Tournament: 1964
Carranza Cup: 1966
Cup Circle Journals & Outdoors: 1966
Mexico Hexagonal: 1968

Nacional (Uruguay) 
Primera División Uruguaya: 1969, 1970, 1971 and 1972
Copa Libertadores: 1971
Intercontinental Cup: 1971

Internacional 
Campeonato Gaúcho: 1974, 1975 and 1976
Campeonato Brasileiro Série A: 1975 and 1976

Operário de Campo Grande 
Campeonato Matogrossense: 1977

Coritiba 
Campeonato Paranaense: 1978

Grêmio 
Campeonato Gaúcho: 1979

Barcelona (Ecuador) 
Campeonato Ecuatoriano: 1981

External links 

1937 births
Living people
Brazilian footballers
Brazilian expatriate footballers
1966 FIFA World Cup players
Botafogo de Futebol e Regatas players
Grêmio Foot-Ball Porto Alegrense players
Club Nacional de Football players
Barcelona S.C. footballers
Sport Club Internacional players
Coritiba Foot Ball Club players
Sport Club do Recife players
Operário Futebol Clube (MS) players
Copa Libertadores-winning players
Brazil international footballers
Expatriate footballers in Ecuador
Expatriate footballers in Uruguay
Brazilian expatriate sportspeople in Ecuador
Brazilian expatriate sportspeople in Uruguay
Association football goalkeepers